The Lioness of Castille (Spanish: La leona de Castilla) is a 1951 Spanish historical drama film directed by Juan de Orduña and starring Amparo Rivelles, Virgilio Teixeira and Alfredo Mayo. 
De Orduña had directed a number of the most expensive Spanish costume films of the era for the leading studio CIFESA. The film portrays the sixteenth century noblewoman María Pacheco, in a fictitious story that has her battling foreign agents during the reign of Charles V.

Synopsis 
After his defeat in the Battle of Villalar, Juan de Padilla, chief of the comuneros, is executed by beheading together with Juan Bravo and Francisco Maldonado in the presence of his wife María de Pacheco and his son. After that they swear, before the Council of the city of Toledo, to avenge her death and continue the war against Carlos I. She is a Castilian lady of high rank, with fragile health but strong character who reacts heroically and participates in dangerous combats against the tyranny of King Carlos I, becoming the Leona de Castilla, a symbol of oppressed popular freedoms.

Cast

References

Bibliography
 Bentley, Bernard. A Companion to Spanish Cinema. Boydell & Brewer 2008.

External links 

1951 films
1950s historical drama films
Films set in Spain
Spanish historical drama films
1950s Spanish-language films
Films directed by Juan de Orduña
Films set in the 16th century
Spanish films based on plays
Cifesa films
Films scored by Juan Quintero Muñoz
1951 drama films
Spanish black-and-white films
1950s Spanish films